Błąkały  is a village in the administrative district of Gmina Dubeninki, within Gołdap County, Warmian-Masurian Voivodeship, in northern Poland, close to the border with the Kaliningrad Oblast of Russia.

The village has a population of 81.

Notable residents
 Gustav Dörr (1887-1928), World War I pilot

References

Villages in Gołdap County